Leonel Juan Daniel Bontempo (born 1 November 1992) is an Argentine footballer who plays as a left-back for Deportivo Morón.

Club career
Born in Buenos Aires, Bontempo played youth football for Quilmes. He made his first team – and Primera División – debut on 4 August 2013, starting in a 0–2 away loss against Rosario Central.

Bontempo already became a regular starter for the club during his first professional campaign, contributing with 18 matches. He remained undisputed in the following three seasons, being released in July 2016 after his contract expired.

In August 2016, Bontempo was linked to a move to Championship club Sheffield Wednesday. However, nothing came of it and he signed for Spanish Segunda División B club Racing de Santander on 20 September.

References

External links

1992 births
Living people
Argentine footballers
Argentine expatriate footballers
Footballers from Buenos Aires
Association football defenders
Argentine Primera División players
Segunda División B players
Quilmes Atlético Club footballers
Racing de Santander players
Barracas Central players
Deportivo Morón footballers
Argentine expatriate sportspeople in Spain
Expatriate footballers in Spain